Four freestyle skiing events were held at the 2006 Winter Olympics in Turin, at the venue in Sauze d'Oulx.  There were both men's and women's competition in both aerials and moguls events.  In moguls, the athletes ski down a slope littered with moguls, attempting to get down in as fast a time as possible while also attempting to get points for technique and their two aerial jumps during the course.  The aerials events consisted of two jumps, which were judged by air, form and landing.

Medal summary

Medal table

Men’s events

Women’s events

Participating NOCs
Twenty-two nations contributed freestyle skiers to the events at Torino.

References

 
2006 Winter Olympics events
2006
2006 in freestyle skiing
Sauze d'Oulx